Gerben J. Zylstra (born January 3, 1959) is an American biochemist, currently Distinguished Professor at Rutgers University and an Elected Fellow of the American Association for the Advancement of Science.

References

Fellows of the American Association for the Advancement of Science
Rutgers University faculty
American biochemists
Living people
1959 births